K.S. Hegde Medical Academy (KSHEMA) is a medical college in Deralakatte, near the city of Mangalore. It is managed by the Nitte Education Trust, which runs a number of professional colleges in the state of Karnataka. The college offers the MBBS course along with post-graduation courses. The Academy was affiliated to RGUHS (Rajiv Gandhi University of Health Sciences) till 2009. Now it is affiliated to NITTE (Deemed to be) University.

Campus
The KS Hegde Medical Academy is located at Deralakatte, a town about 13 km from Mangalore.

History
K S Hegde Medical Academy was established in 1999 by the Nitte Education Trust. The college is named after the visionary and founder, late Justice K. S. Hegde, former Justice of the Supreme Court of India and former Speaker of the Lok Sabha and social worker

Department
Anesthesiology
Anatomy
Biochemistry
Community Medicine
Dermatology
Otorhinolaryngology
Forensic Medicine
General Medicine
General Surgery
Microbiology
Neuroscience
Obstetrics & Gynecology
Ophthalmology
Orthopedics
Pediatrics
Pathology
Pharmacology
Physiology
Psychiatry
Radio diagnosis & Imaging
TB, Chest and Respiratory Diseases

Sister institute
A B Shetty College of dental sciences (managed by Nitte education trust)
Nitte Usha Institute of Nursing Sciences

Admissions

Undergraduate course
Since 2019 admissions under the General Merit category are being conducted via centralised single window counselling on the basis of merit (rank) obtained in the All India Entrance Test, National Eligibility cum Entrance Test (NEET), conducted by NTA.

Courses offered

UG course
M.B.B.S. (4½ year course + 1 year medical internship)

PG courses

M.D.
Nanotechnology
Anatomy
Physiology
Forensic Medicine
Biochemistry
Pharmacology
Pathology
Microbiology
Community medicine
General Medicine
Dermatology
Psychiatry
Pediatrics
Anesthesiology
Radiology

M.S.
General Surgery
Ophthalmology
Orthopaedics
Obstetrics and gynecology
ENT

International collaborations
KSHEMA has signed an agreement of co-operation with The University of Texas Health Science Center at Houston, USA for co-operation in research, in diseases like malaria and tuberculosis. The college has established a state-of-the-art regional research centre on communicable diseases in collaboration with the University of Texas Health Sciences, on the campus.
The Institute also has a staff exchange and training programme with Maimonides Medical Center, Brooklyn, USA.

Recent developments
The college hospital recently opened a super specialty block for Nuclear Medicine, Cardiology, Neurology, Neurosurgery, Cardiothoracic Surgery, Paediatric Surgery, Urology, Nephrology, Plastic Surgery, Gastroenterology and Oncology.

Rankings 

KSHEMA was ranked 14 among private medical colleges in India in 2022 by Outlook India.

References

External links

 

Medical colleges in Karnataka
Universities and colleges in Mangalore